Princeton Independent School District is a rural public school district based in Princeton, Texas (USA).

Since 2018 Princeton ISD has received an 'A' rating (equivalent to previous rating system 'exemplary') by the Texas Education Agency.

Schools
 Princeton High School (Grades 10-12)
 Lovelady High School (Grade 9)
 Clark Middle School (Grades 6-8)
 Southard Middle School (Grades 6-8) 
 Godwin Elementary School (Grades K-5)
 Lacy Elementary School (Grades K-5)
 Lowe Elementary School (Grades K-5)
 Mayfield Elementary School (Grade K-5)
 Harper Elementary School (Grades K-5)
 Smith Elementary School (Grades K-5)
 Canup Early Childhood Center (Grade PK)
 Mattei Middle School - Coming up
 Green Elementary School - Coming up

Administration
The district is led by Superintendent Donald McIntyre and seven trustees: Board President Cyndi Darland, Vice President Chad Jones, Secretary Duane Kelly, Bob Lovelady, Carlos Cuellar, 
Julia Schmoker & John Campbell.

References

External links

Princeton Band

School districts in Collin County, Texas